Lydia Rabinowitsch-Kempner (22 August 1871 – 3 August 1935) was a Jewish bacteriologist and physician, known for her research on tuberculosis and public health. She was the second woman to become a Professor in Prussia.

Biography

Lydia Rabinowitsch was born at Kovno, Russian Empire (now Kaunas, Lithuania). She was educated at the girls' gymnasium of her native city, and privately in Latin and Greek, subsequently studying natural sciences at the universities of Zurich and Bern (MD). After graduation she went to Berlin, where Professor Robert Koch permitted her to pursue her bacteriological studies at the Institute for Infectious Diseases. She became the second woman in Prussia employed as a professor, and the first in Berlin.

In 1895, she went to Philadelphia, where she was appointed lecturer and, subsequently, professor at the Woman's Medical College of Pennsylvania. There she founded a bacteriological institute, though still continuing her studies every summer under Professor Koch in Berlin.

In 1896, she delivered before the International Congress of Women at Berlin a lecture on the study of medicine by women in various countries. At the congress of scientists held at Breslau in 1904 she presided over the section for hygiene and bacteriology.

In 1898, she married microbiologist Dr Walter Kempner (1869-1920) of Berlin, and returned to that city. Their son, Dr Walter Kempner Jr. (1903-1997), was also a medical doctor. He was known for his rice diet. Their other son was the jurist Robert Kempner (1899-1993). A daughter, Nadja Kempner, died from tuberculosis in 1932.
 She died in 1935 in Berlin, aged 63, from undisclosed causes.

References

Sources

Bibliography
 Anna Plothow. Der Weltspiegel, October 27, 1904
 Deutsche Hausfrauenzeitung, July 1897, by  Isidore Singer & Regina Neisser
 Beiträge zur Entwickelungsgeschichte der Fruchtkörper einiger Gastromyceten, L Rabinowitsch, 1894

1871 births
1935 deaths
American bacteriologists
American feminists
American emigrants to Germany
German bacteriologists
German feminists
Emigrants from the Russian Empire to the United States
Jewish American scientists
Jewish feminists
Lithuanian Jews
Physicians from Kaunas
American women biologists
Robert Koch Institute people
International Congress of Women people